This article is a list of Valentine's Day-themed television episodes and specials.

Children and family shows
101 Dalmatians: The Series:
"Love 'Em and Flea 'Em" (1997)
"Valentine Daze" (1997)
Abby Hatcher: Hearts and Hugs Day (2019)
The Adventures of Jimmy Neutron, Boy Genius: "Love Potion 976/J" (2004)
Adventures of Sonic the Hedgehog: 
"Best Hedgehog" (1993)
"Lovesick Sonic" (1993)
Adventures in Wonderland: "A Change of Heart" (1993)
American Dragon: Jake Long: 
"The Ski Trip" (2005)
"The Love Cruise" (2007)
Amphibia: "Dating Season" (2019)
Angelina Ballerina: "Angelina's Valentine" / "The Royal Banquet" (2002)
Angelina Ballerina: The Next Steps: "Angelina and the Big News" / "Angelina's Secret Valentine" (2010)
Arthur:
"Love Notes for Muffy" (1998)
"The Long, Dull Winter" (1999)
"Buster's Secret Admirer" (2011)
"Mr. Ratburn and the Special Someone" (2019)
The Backyardigans: "Special Delivery" (2007)
Barney & Friends: "Be My Valentine Love, Barney" (2000)
Bear In The Big Blue House: "Love Is All You Need" (1998)
Big City Greens: "Valentine's Dance" (2019)
Big Nate: "Valentine's Day of Horror" (2022)
Blue's Clues: "Love Day" (2004)
Blue's Clues & You!: "What I Like About Blue" (2021)
Blue's Room: "It's Hug Day" (2005)
The Book of Pooh: "My Gloomy Valentine" (2001)
Caillou:
"Mystery Valentine" (2000)
"Caillou's Valentine" (2007)
Captain Flamingo: "Change of Heart" (2007)
 The Care Bears:
"The Care Bears Adventures in Wonderland" (1987)
"The Lost Gift / Lotsa Heart's Wish" (1988)
The Cat in the Hat Knows a Lot About That!: "Pick Your Friends" (2011)
The Charlie Brown and Snoopy Show: "Lucy Loves Schroeder" (1985)
Clifford the Big Red Dog: 
"T-Bone, Dog About Town" / "Clifford's Big Heart" (2001)
"Big Hearted T-Bone" / "Cleo's Valentine Surprise" (2002)
Clifford the Big Red Dog (2019): "Clifford's Valentine Collection" (2021)
Clifford's Puppy Days:
"Your Secret Valentine" / "Perfect Pet" (2004)
"Valentines Schmalentines" / "Sweetheart's Dance" (2006)
Curious George: "Happy Valentine's Day, George" (2015)
Cyberchase: 
"Hugs & Witches" (2003)
"A Garden Grows in Botlyn" (2020)
Daniel Tiger's Neighborhood:
"I Love You, Mom" (2012)
"It's Love Day!/Daniel's Love Day Surprise" (2015)
Danny Phantom: "Lucky in Love" (2005)
Darkwing Duck: "My Valentine Ghoul" (1992)
Dinosaur Train: 
"Erma and the Conductor" (2012)
"Love Day" (2020)
Doc McStuffins: "My Huggy Valentine" (2013)
Dora the Explorer: 
"Te Amo" (2001)
"Best Friends" (2005)
"The Grumpy Old Troll Gets Married" (2011)
"Dora in Wonderland" (2014)
Doug: "Doug Plays Cupid" (1999)
Dragon Tales: "Hands Together" (2001)
DuckTales: "A Duck Tales' Valentine" (1990)
Ed, Edd n Eddy: "Ed, Edd n Eddy's Hanky Panky Hullabaloo" (2005)
Elena of Avalor: "Sweetheart's Day" (2020)
The Emperor's New School: "Everyone Loves Kuzco" (2008)
The Fairly OddParents: 
"Love Struck!" (2003)
"Love at First Height" (2005)
"Love Triangle" (2011)
Fanboy & Chum Chum: "Robo-mance" (2012)
Fancy Nancy: "Mon Amie... Grace?" (2019)
The Flintstones:
 "The Engagement Ring" (1960)
 "Love Letters on the Rocks" (1960)
 "Fred Flintstone Woos Again" (1961)
 "Latin Lover" (1962)
 "I Yabba-Dabba Do!" (1993)
Franklin: "Franklin's Valentines" (1998)
Go, Diego, Go!: "Sammy's Valentine" (2007)
Go, Dog. Go!: "A Ball for All" (2021)
Gravity Falls: "The Love God" (2014)
Handy Manny:
"Valentine's Day" (2008)
"Valentine's Day Party" (2013)
Harvey Beaks: "Anti-Valentine's Day" (2015)
Hey Arnold!: "Arnold's Valentine" (1997)
Henry Hugglemonster: "Monsterly Ever After" (2015)
Higglytown Heroes: "A Valentine for Miss Fern; The Totally Secret Valentine" (2006)
House of Mouse: "Goofy's Valentine Date" (2001)
If You Give a Mouse a Cookie: "If You Give a Mouse a Valentine's Cookie" (2020)
Jacob Two-Two: "Jacob Two Two and the Valentine's Day Disaster" (2005)
The Jetsons: "Judy's Elopement" (1985)
Johnny Bravo: "It's Valentine's Day Johnny Bravo" (2004) 
Kate & Mim-Mim: "Valentine Friends" (2014)
Katie and Orbie: "Hearts!" (2002)
Kim Possible: "The Cupid Effect" (2007)
Lilo & Stitch: The Series: "Hunkahunka" (2004)
Little Bear: "Valentines Day" (1999)
Little Einsteins: "Annie's Love Song" (2007)
Llama Llama: "I Heart You!" (2018)
Lloyd in Space: "Love Beam #9" (2002)
Looney Tunes Cartoons: "Looney Tunes Cartoons Valentine's Extwavaganza!" (2022)
The Loud House: "Singled Out/Brave the Last Dance" (2020)
Madeline: "Madeline's Valentine" (2001)
Martha Speaks: "Martha and the Thief of Hearts" (2009)
Max & Ruby: "Max's Valentine" (2003)
Maya & Miguel: "Cupid" (2007)
Mickey Mouse Clubhouse: "A Surprise for Minnie" (2006)
Mickey and the Roadster Racers/Mickey Mouse Mixed-Up Adventures:
"The Happiest Helpers Cruise!" (2017)
"Happy Valentine Helpers" (2020)
Mickey Mouse:
"Goofy's First Love" (2015)
"Locked in Love" (2017)
Mighty Express: "Chug-a-Love Day" (2021)
Minnie's Bow-Toons: "Minnie's Valentine" (2022)
Miss BG: "Miss BG’s Gets a Valentine" (2005)
Molly of Denali: "Valentine's Day Disaster/Porcupine Slippers" (2020)
Muppet Babies: "Happy Villain-tine's Day" (2022)
My Friends Tigger & Pooh: "How to Say I Love Roo" (2007)
My Little Pony: Friendship Is Magic:
"Hearts and Hooves Day" (2012) 
"The Break Up Break Down" (2018)
Nature Cat: "Happy Halentine's Day!" (2016)
The New Adventures of Winnie the Pooh: "Un-Valentine's Day" (1989)
The New Woody Woodpecker Show: "Date With Destiny" (2000)
Nilus the Sandman: "Cupid's Bow" (1996)
Ni Hao Kai-Lan : "Kai-Lan's Big Surprise" (2009)
Oobi: "Valentine" (2005)
PAW Patrol: "Pups Save Friendship Day" (2016)
PB&J Otter: "Ducking Out on Valentine's Day" (2000)
Peanuts by Schulz:
"A Little Love" (2016)
"Just for Love" (2016)
Peg + Cat: 
"The Romeo and Juliet Problem" (2014)
"The Wonderland Problem" (2015)
"The Valentine's Day Problem" (2017)
"The Mariachi Problem" (2017)
Peppa Pig: 
"Valentine's Day" (2020)
"Valentine's Pizza" (2023)
"Valentine's Surprise" (2023)
The Penguins of Madagascar:
"Monkey Love" (2009)
"Otter Things Have Happened" (2009)
"Love Takes Flightless" (2012)
"Tunnel of Love" (2015)
Phineas and Ferb:
"That Sinking Feeling" (2009)
"Act Your Age" (2015)
Pinkalicious & Peterrific: 
"Pink Love" (2019)
"Cupid Calls It Quits" (2021)
 The Pink Panther: "Valentine Pink" (1993)
Pixel Pinkie:
"Valentine's Day" (2009)
"Truth Or Dare" (2009)
The Proud Family: "I Love You Penny Proud" (2002)
The Proud Family: Louder and Prouder: "The End of Innocence" (2023)
Puppy Dog Pals: 
"Valentine Surprise" (2019)
"Valentine's Day Mix-Up" (2020)
"My Bobby Valentine" (2021)
"A Valentine's Gift for Ana" (2022)
Recess : "My Funny Valentines" (2000)
The Replacements: "Kumquat Day" (2007)
Robot and Monster: "J.D. Loves Gart" / "Misery Date" (2015)
Rocko's Modern Life: 
"Love Spanked" (1993)
"S.W.A.K." (1996)
Rolie Polie Olie: "Looove Bug" (1999)
Rugrats / All Grown Up!:
 "Be My Valentine" (2000)
 "It's Cupid, Stupid" (2004)
The Save-Ums!: "Make Those Valentines!" (2005)
Sesame Street: "Episode 4606: Valentine's Day" (2016)
Sheriff Callie's Wild West: "The Heartless Valentine's Day" (2017)
The Smurfs: "My Smurfy Valentine" (1983)
The Snoopy Show: "Well, I’ll be a Brown-Eyed Beagle" (2022)
Spirit Riding Free: Riding Academy: "Palentine's Day" (2020)
SpongeBob SquarePants: "Valentine's Day" (2000)
Super Monsters: "Monster Heart-Friend Night" (2019)
Super Why!: 
"Peter Rabbit" (2009)
"Alice in Wonderland" (2009)
"Cinderella: The Prince's Side of the Story" (2009)
The Sylvester & Tweety Mysteries: "Is Paris Stinking?" (1997)
Teacher's Pet: "Taint Valentine's Day" (2002)
Teen Titans Go!:
"Be Mine" (2014)
"How 'Bout Some Effort" (2016)
"Looking for Love" (2023)
This is Daniel Cook.: "Making a Valentine's Day Card" (2006)
Timon & Pumbaa: "Timon in Love" (1999)
Timothy Goes to School: "Be My Valentine" (2002)
Totally Spies!: "Green With N.V." (2003)
T.O.T.S.: "The Valentine Spirit" (2020)
T.U.F.F. Puppy:
"Puppy Love" (2010)
"Snap Dad" (2011)
"Til Doom Do Us Part" (2014)
"T.U.F.F. Love" (2015)
Underdog: "Simon Says, Be My Valentine" (1967)
Unikitty!: "Perfect Moment" (2019)
Vampirina: "Vee Is for Valentine" (2018)
Veggietales: "Duke and the Great Pie War" (2005)
The VeggieTales Show: "The Power of Love" (2020)
Wallykazam!:
"Buddy Pal Friend Day" (2016)
"The Chickephant's Getting Married" (2017)
The Weekenders: "My Punky Valentine" / "Brain Envy" (2001)
Welcome to Pooh Corner: "Pooh's Funny Valentine's Day" (1984)
What's New, Scooby-Doo?: "A Scooby-Doo Valentine" (2005)
The Wild Thornberrys: "Operation Valentine" (2001)
Wonder Pets!: "Save the Lovebugs!" (2010)
Wordgirl: "Cherish is the Word" (2011)
WordWorld: "My Fuzzy Valentine" / "Love, Bug" (2009)
Wow! Wow! Wubbzy!: 
"Mr. Valentine" (2007)
"Cupid's Helper" (2009)
"My Speedy Valentine" (2009)
Yo Gabba Gabba: "Love" (2008)

Dramas
7th Heaven:
"Happy's Valentine" (1997)
"Loves Me, Loves Me Not" (2000)
"V-Day" (2001)
"Hot Pants" (2002)
"Red Socks" (2005)
"Love and Obsession" (2006)
"Tit for Tat" (2007)
21 Jump Street: "Chapel of Love" (1988)
Arrow:
"Guilty" (2014)
"Draw Back Your Bow" (2014)
"Suicidal Tendencies" (2015)
"Broken Hearts" (2016)
"The Sin-Eater" (2017)
"Past Sins" (2019)
"Brothers and Sisters" (2019)
Blue Bloods: "My Funny Valentine" (2011)
Boardwalk Empire: "The Old Ship of Zion" (2013)
Bones: "The Bikini in the Soup" (2011)
Castle
"The Final Nail" (2011)
"Reality Star Struck" (2013)
 Charmed
 "Animal Pragmatism" (2000)
 "Carpe Demon" (2005)
 "Engaged and Confused" (2006)
Desperate Houswives: 
"Love is in the Air" (2005)
"Thank You So Much" (2006)
"Is This What You Call Love" (2012)
Downton Abbey: "Episode One" (2013)
Dr. Quinn, Medicine Woman: "What is Love?" (1995)
Early Edition: "Funny Valentine" (1999)
ER:
"Make of Two Hearts" (1995)
"Be Still My Heart" (2000)
Everwood: "My Funny Valentine" (2003)
The Flash (2014):
"Attack on Central City" (2017)
"Love Is A Battlefield" (2020)
Gilmore Girls: "A Vineyard Valentine" (2006)
Good Trouble: "Palentine's Day" (2020)
Grey's Anatomy:
"Valentine's Day Massacre" (2010)
"All You Need Is Love" (2012)
Hawaii Five-0:
"E ʻImi pono" (2015)
"Hoa 'inea" (2016)
"Poniu I Ke Aloha" (2017)
"He kauwa ke kanaka na ke aloha" (2020)
Las Vegas: "Tainted Love" (2005)
The Love Boat:
"The Zinging Valentine/The Very Temporary Secretary/Final Score" (1979)
"The Love Boat: A Valentine Voyage" (1990)
Mad Men:
"For Those Who Think Young" (2008)
"A Day's Work" (2014)
Medium: "The One Behind the Wheel" (2007)
Once Upon a Time: "Skin Deep" (2012)
Picket Fences: "Be My Valentine" (1993)
The Resident: "Stupid Things in the Name of Sex" (2019)
The Rookie: "Heartbreak" (2019)
Supergirl: "Mr. & Mrs. Mxyzptlk" (2017)
This Is Us:
"Songbird Road: Part Two" (2019)
"The Night Before the Wedding" (2022)
Tru Calling: "Valentine" (2004)

Horror
Into the Dark:
"Down" (2019)
"My Valentine" (2020)
"Tentacles" (2021)
Supernatural:
"My Bloody Valentine" (2010)
"Love Hurts" (2016)

Sitcoms
2 Broke Girls: "And the Broken Hearts" (2012)
3rd Rock from the Sun: "Dick Puts the 'ID' in Cupid" (2000)
8 Simple Rules: "Torn Between Two Lovers" (2005)
30 Rock:
"Up All Night" (2007)
"St. Valentine's Day" (2009)
"Anna Howard Shaw Day" (2010)
"Hey, Baby, What's Wrong" (2012)
A Different World:
"Dr. Cupid" (1988)
"Breaking Up Is Hard To Do" (1989)
"Love, Hillman-Style" (1991)
Abbott Elementary: "Valentine's Day" (2023)
About a Boy: "About a Cat Party" (2015)
According to Jim: "Blow-Up" (2002)
The Adventures of Ozzie and Harriet: "The Valentine Show" (1953)
Alice: "My Funny Valentine Tux' (1980)
American Dad!: "May the Best Stan Win" (2010)
American Housewife: "Time For Love" (2017)
Arrested Development: "Marta Compllex" (2004)
At Home with Amy Sedaris: "Valentine's Day" (2020)
Becker:
"Love! Lies! Bleeding!" (1999)
"V-Day" (2002)
Better With You: "Better With Valentine's Day" (2011)
The Big Bang Theory:
"The Large Hadron Collision" (2010)
"The Tangible Affection Proof" (2013)
"The Locomotive Manipulation" (2014)
"The Valentino Submergence" (2016)
Big Mouth: "My Furry Valentine" (2019)
Black-ish:
"Big Night, Big Fight" (2015)
"The Name Game" (2017)
"Dreamgirls and Boys" (2019)
"The Gauntlet" (2020)
Bob Hearts Abishola: "Black Ice" (2020)
Bob's Burgers: 
"My Fuzzy Valentine" (2013)
"Can't Buy Me Math" (2015)
"The Gene and Courtney Show" (2016)
"Bob Actually" (2017)
"V for Valentine-detta" (2018)
"Bed, Bob & Beyond" (2019)
"Romancing the Beef" (2021)
Boy Meets World:
"First Girlfriend's Club" (1998)
"My Baby Valentine" (1999)
Cheers: "Sam Time Next Year" (1991)
City Guys: "Dating Games" (2000)
The Cleveland Show:
"A Short Story and a Tall Tale" (2011)
"Here Comes the Bribe" (2013)
Coach: "Call Me Cupid" (1995)
Community:
"Communication Studies" (2010)
"Early 21st Century Romanticism" (2011)
Cosby: "Valentine's Day" (1997)
Cybill:
"Call Me Irresponsible" (1995)
"Valentine's Day" (1997)
Dave's World: "Loves Me Like a Rock" (1996)
Dr. Ken:
"Dave's Valentine" (2016)
"A Dr. Ken Valentine's Day" (2017)
Everybody Hates Chris: "Everybody Hates Valentine's Day" (2006)
Everybody Loves Raymond: "Diamonds" (1997)
Family Guy: 
"Valentine's Day in Quahog" (2013)
"Boy (Dog) Meets Girl Dog" (2018)
Family Matters:
"My Broken-Hearted Valentine" (1992)
"Heart Strings" (1993)
"Le jour d'amour" (1997)
Family Reunion: "Remember My Funny Valentine?" (2021)
Frasier: 
"Three Valentines" (1999)
"Out With Dad" (2000)
Friends/Joey: 
"The One with the Candy Hearts" (1995)
"The One With Unagi" (2000)
"The One with the Birthing Video" (2002)
"The One with Phoebe's Wedding" (2004)
 "Joey and the Valentine's Date" (2005)
The Fresh Prince of Bel Air: "Stop Will in the Name of Love" (1994)
Full House:
"Little Shop of Sweaters" (1989)
"The Heartbreak Kid" (1993)
"Joey's Funny Valentine" (1994)
"Dateless in San Francisco" (1995)
Futurama:
"Put Your Head on My Shoulders" (2000)
"Love and Rocket" (2002)
George Lopez: "The Valentine's Day Massacre" (2003)
Ghosts: "A Date to Remember" (2023)
Gimme a Break!: "Valentine" (1984)
The Goldbergs:
"Lainey Loves Lionel" (2016)
"Agassi" (2017)
"My Valentine Boy" (2019)
"Preventa Mode" (2020)
"A Peck of Familial Love" (2022)
The Golden Girls: "Valentine's Day" (1989)
Grace Under Fire: "Valentine's Day" (1994)
Happy Days: "Be My Valentine" (1978)
Happy Endings: "The St. Valentine's Day Maxssacre" (2012)
Harley Quinn: "Harley Quinn: A Very Problematic Valentine's Day Special" (2023)
Head of the Class: "Valentine's Day" (1987)
Herman's Head: "My Funny Valentine" (1993)
Home Improvement: "A Funny Valentine" (1997)
Honey, I Shrunk the Kids: The TV Show: "Honey, I'm in the Mood for Love" (1998)
How I Met Your Mother:
"Rabbit or Duck" (2010)
"Desperation Day" (2011)
"The Drunk Train" (2012)
In the House: "My Crazy Valentine" (1996)
The Jeffersons: "I Buy the Songs" (1981) 
The King of Queens:
"S'Ain't Valentine's" (1999)
"Meet By-Product" (2000)
"Animal Attraction" (2003)
Last Man Standing: "Tasers" (2014) 
Less than Perfect: "Valentine's Day" (2003)
Letterkenny: "Valentimes Day" (2019)
Life in Pieces:
"Tattoo Valentine Guitar Pregnant" (2016)
"Necklace Rescue Chef Negotiator" (2017)
Life with Derek: "Rumor Mill" (2008)
Living Single: "Singing the Blues" (1995)
The Loretta Young Show: "The Black Lace Valentine" (1959)
Love & War: "Valentine's Day" (1995)
Mad About You: 
"Love Among the Tiles" (1993)
"Valentine's Day" (1999)
Major Dad: "Valentine's Day" (1991)
Mama's Family: "My Phony Valentine" (1989)
Man with a Plan:
"Valentine's Day" (2017)
"Adam's Turtle-y Awesome Valentine's Day" (2018)
The Many Loves of Dobie Gillis: "Lassie Get Lost' (1963)
Married... with Children:
"Peggy Loves Al - Yeah, Yeah, Yeah" (1988)
"Valentine's Day Massacre" (1994)
The Middle:
"Valentine's Day" (2010)
"Valentine's Day II" (2011)
"Valentine's Day III" (2012)
"Valentine's Day IV" (2013)
"Valentine's Day VI" (2015)
Mike & Molly:
"First Valentine's Day" (2011)
"Valentine's Piggyback" (2012)
Mixed-ish: "This Charming Man" (2020)
Modern Family:
"My Funky Valentine" (2010)
"Bixby's Back" (2011)
"Heart Broken" (2013)
"Valentine's Day 4: Twisted Sister" (2015)
"Do You Believe in Magic" (2017)
Mom: "Sparkling Banter and a Failing Steel Town" (2019)
Mr. Belvedere: "Valentine's Day" (1986)
Mrs. Brown's Boys: "Mammy's Valentine" (2013)
Murphy Brown: "Why Do Fools Fall in Love?" (1989)
The Nanny: "Love is a Many Blundered Thing" (1996)
Newhart: "Once I Had a Secret Love" (1985)
New Girl:
"Valentine's Day" (2012)
"The Crawl" (2015)
"Operation: Bobcat" (2017)
Night Court: "Billie's Valentine" (1985)
The Oblongs: "Valentine Day" (2003)
The Office: 
"Valentine's Day" (2006)
"Blood Drive" (2009)
"The Manager and the Salesman" (2010)
"PDA" (2011)
"Special Project" (2012)
"Couples Discount" (2013)
One Day at a Time: "One Valentine's Day at a Time" (2019)
Parks and Recreation: 
"Galentine's Day" (2010)
"Operation Ann" (2012)
"Galentine's Day" (2014)
Punky Brewster: "My Aged Valentine" (1985)
Reba: "Valentine's Day" (2003)
Roseanne: "Valentine's Day" (1991)
Sabrina the Teenage Witch:
"First Kiss" (1997)
"The Equalizer" (1998)
"Sabrina, the Matchmaker" (1999)
"Love in Bloom" (2000)
"Love Is a Many Complicated Thing" (2001)
Schooled: "Singled Out" (2020)
See Dad Run: "See Dad Nail Valentine’s Day" (2014)
The Simpsons:
"I Love Lisa" (1993)
"I'm with Cupid" (1999)
"Love, Springfieldian Style" (2008)
"The Daughter Also Rises" (2012)
"Specs and the City" (2014)
"Love Is in the N2-O2-Ar-CO2-Ne-He-CH4" (2016)
Single Parents:
"A Cash-Grab Cooked Up By the Crepe Paper Industry" (2019)
"Chez Second Grade" (2020)
Sister, Sister:
"Valentine's Day" (1996)
"Three the Heart Way" (1997)
"Ladies' Choice" (1998)
South Park: 
"Tom's Rhinoplasty" (1998)
"Cupid Ye" (2023)
Speechless:
"V-a-l-Valentine's D-a-Day" (2017)
"J-i-Jimmy V-a-l-Valentine" (2019)
Step by Step: "Love, Port Washington Style" (1993)
Still Standing: "Still Romancing" (2003)
Suburgatory: "Blowtox and Burlap" (2013)
Superstore:
"Valentine's Day" (2017)
"Love Birds" (2019)
That Girl: "The Earrings" (1969)
Two and a Half Men:
"Sips, Sonnets and Sodomy" (2012)
"Advantage: Fat, Flying Baby" (2013)
Two Guys, a Girl and a Pizza Place: "Two Guys, a Girl and Valentine's Day" (1999)
Two of a Kind: "First Crush" (1998)
Up All Night: "Day After Valentine's Day" (2012)
Veronica's Closet: "Veronica's Candy Panties" (2000)
Webster: "Love Papadapolis Style" (1986)
Wendell & Vinnie: "Valentine's & the Cultural Experience" (2013)
What I Like About You:
"Valentine's Day" (2003)
"Stupid Cupid" (2005)
Who's The Boss?: "Jonathon Plays Cupid" (1986)
Will & Grace: "Dance Cards & Greeting Cards" (2005)
Wings: "Looking for Love in All the Wrong Places" (1991)
The Wonder Years: "St. Valentine's Day Massacre" (1990)
The Wonder Years (2021): "The Valentine's Day Dance" (2022)
Work With Me: "Crush" 
Yes, Dear: "House of Cards" (2003)
Young & Hungry: "Young & Valentine's Day" (2017)

Teen shows
6teen: "Stupid Over Cupid" (2005)
90210: "Of Heartbreaks and Hotels" (1998)
13 Reasons Why: 
"Tape 3, Side B" (2017)
"Valentine's Day" (2020)
Awkward: "The New Sex Deal" (2014) 
The Baby-Sitters Club: "Mary Anne and the Great Romance" (2021)
Beverly Hills, 90210:
"You Gotta Have Heart" (1995)
"Bleeding Hearts" (1996)
"My Funny Valentine" (1997)
"Cupid's Arrow" (1998)
"Beheading St. Valentine" (1999)
"The Final Proof" (2000)
Buffy the Vampire Slayer: "Bewitched, Bothered and Bewildered" (1998)
California Dreams: "My Valentine" (1995) 
Chilling Adventures of Sabrina: "Chapter Fourteen: Lupercalia" (2019)
Clueless: "Child Bride" (1999)
Dawson's Creek:
"The Valentine's Day Massacre" (2000)
Free Rein: "Free Rein: Valentine’s Day" (2019)
Glee:
"Silly Love Songs" (2011)
"Heart" (2012)
"I Do" (2013)
Gossip Girl: "Crazy, Cupid, Love" (2012)
"It-Girl Happened One Night" (2011)
Grand Army: "Valentine's Day" (2020)
Greek: "Love, Actually, Possibly, Maybe... or Not" (2010)
H2O: Just Add Water: "Valentine's Day" (2009)
Henry Danger: "My Phony Valentine" (2015)
High School Musical: The Musical: The Series: "Valentine’s Day" (2021)
Jonas: "Love Sick" (2009)
Life with Boys: "Girl-Entine's Day With Boys" (2013)
Make It or Break It: "Loves Me, Loves Me Not" (2010)
My Life as Liz: "My Sketchy Valentine" (2010)
Ned's Declassified School Survival Guide: "Valentine's Day & School Websites" (2006)
The Naked Brothers Band: "Valentine Dream Date" (2009)
Nicky, Ricky, Dicky & Dawn: "Valentime's Day" (2015)
The O.C: "The Heartbreak" (2004)
One Tree Hill: "Valentine's Day Is Over" (2011)
Pepper Ann: "A Valentine's Day Tune" (2000)
Pretty Little Liars: "The New Normal" (2011)
Saved by the Bell: "Isn't It Romantic?" (1992)
The Secret Circle: "Valentine" (2012)
Switched at Birth: "Human/Need/Desire" (2013) 
That '70s Show:
"First Date" (1999)
"Donna's Panties" (2001)
"Kelso's Career" (2002)
"Killer Queen" (2006)
That's So Raven: "Hearts and Minds" (2004)
True Jackson, VP: "True Valentine" (2010)
Wizards of Waverly Place: 
"Baby Cupid" (2008)
"Alex Russo, Matchmaker?" (2010)

Reality shows
Cake Boss: "Roses, Romance, and Romeo" (2010)
Chrisley Knows Best: "My Chrisley Valentine" (2015)
Dance Moms: "Boy Crazy, Mom Crazy" (2013)
The Girls Next Door: "Hearts Afire" (2007)
Kate Plus 8: "Valentine's Day" (2008)
The Little Couple: "It's Valentine's Day" (2011)
Nickelodeon's Unfiltered: 	"Be My Valentine!" (2021)
The Osbournes: "Valentine Daze" (2004)
OutDaughtered: "My Busby Valentine" (2020)
The Real Housewives of Orange County: "Valentines and Birthday Wishes" (2014)
Sister Wives: 
"Robyn's Secret" (2013)
"4 Wives, 4 Valentine's" (2012)
 Teen Mom: "Valentine's Day" (2010)

Specials
A Charlie Brown Valentine (2002)
The Berenstain Bears' Comic Valentine (1982)
Be My Valentine, Charlie Brown (1975)
Bugs Bunny's Valentine (1979)
Cathy's Valentine (1989)
DTV Doggone Valentine (1987)
DTV Valentine (1986)
I Love the Chipmunks Valentine Special (1984)
It's Your First Kiss, Charlie Brown (1977)
Michael Bolton's Big, Sexy Valentine's Day Special (2017)
The Muppets Valentine Show (1974)
The Pink Panther in: Pink at First Sight (1981)
Someday You'll Find Her, Charlie Brown (1981)
A Special Valentine with the Family Circus (1978)
There's No Time for Love, Charlie Brown (1973)
The Valentine's Day that Almost Wasn't (1982)
Winnie the Pooh: A Valentine for You (1999)
You're in Love, Charlie Brown (1967)

See also
 List of films set around Valentine's Day
 Lists of television specials
 List of United States Christmas television episodes
 List of Christmas television specials
 List of Easter television specials
 List of Halloween television specials
 List of St. Patrick's Day television specials
 List of Thanksgiving television specials

 
Lists of television episodes by holiday
Lists of television specials